Liocarcinus pusillus, common name dwarf swimming crab, is a species of crab in the Portunidae family.

Description
This species occurs in a wide range of colours. The front has three sharpened tusks, directed forward.

Distribution
Liocarcinus pusillus occurs from North-West Africa, to Lofoten, Norway including the North Sea. It is found around the shores of: England, in such places as Northumberland, Yorkshire, The Wash, Thames, the eastern English Channel, Isle of Wight, Portland, Plymouth, the Scilly Isles, the Bristol Channel, Liverpool Bay; Scotland - Shetland, Orkney, Firth of Forth, Argyll and Clyde, The Minch; Ireland, occurring in and around Dublin, Belfast, Mayo, Galway Bay, Fastnet Rock, Cork; and elsewhere in the British Isles including the Channel Islands, Anglesey and the Isle of Man.

Habitat
Specimens range intertidally up to 100 metres, dwelling on sandy to stony bottoms, but prefer gravel or stony substrates.

References

Portunoidea
Crustaceans described in 1815